The 2009 European Parliament election in Austria was the 2009 election of the delegation from Austria to the European Parliament. Austria will have 17 seats in the European Parliament, instead of the 18 that the country had before the re-allocation of seats.

Through the Lisbon Treaty, the number of seats was graded to 19, so the SPÖ and BZÖ parties got additional seats, which are currently Observer MEPs.

Contesting parties

SPÖ
The SPÖ announced that their frontrunner will be current MEP Hannes Swoboda.

ÖVP
The ÖVP surprisingly selected former Interior Minister Ernst Strasser to lead their party. 2004 frontrunner and MEP Othmar Karas, initially the favourite for the first place on the ÖVP party list, was listed in second place. Nonetheless, a large number of famous ÖVP members, including all living former ÖVP chairmen, launched a supporting committee for Karas.

FPÖ
Andreas Mölzer was selected to lead the FPÖ's lists again, and Heinz-Christian Strache claimed that up to 30% were possible; Mölzer stated that he wanted to reach 17.5% again, as in the 2008 elections.

Die Grünen
At the Greens' party congress on 17–18 January 2009, long-time MEP Johannes Voggenhuber was not selected for the first place on the party list, with Ulrike Lunacek being elected instead; Voggenhuber had announced he would not stand in any other place on the list and thus will withdraw from politics after the election. However, in the days after the decision, it was not ruled out that Voggenhuber might run on his own; he later emphatically stated he would not do that. It was announced in late January that he might stand in the 16th place on the list, making it possible for him to be ranked first in preferences with more than 7% of the Greens' votes in the election. The party leadership rejected this possibility in a meeting on 30 January 2009, angering many of the Greens' supporters. Cyriak Schwaighofer, the Greens' leader in Salzburg, then stated he would do what he could to get Voggenhuber on the list as a regional MEP candidate for Salzburg, but the Greens' leadership again rejected this idea.

BZÖ
The BZÖ picked Ewald Stadler to head their list; they did not want to run together with the Libertas Party, but stated that they were interested in cooperation after the election.

Hans-Peter Martin
MEP Hans-Peter Martin, who got 14% of the vote in the 2004 elections as an Independent, announced on 27 April that he would run again, stating he was sure he would defend his strong third-place showing in the 2004 elections.

Young Liberals
Liberal Forum MEP Karin Resetarits gave the Young Liberals (a sub-organisation of the LIF, both its youth party and its student organisation) the possibility to contest the election. It later emerged that the LIF would in fact have liked to contest the election, but that it had counted on Resetarits' signature in order to contest the election; as she had given it to the Young Liberals, they could stand in the election while the LIF could not.

KPÖ
The Communist Party of Austria announced on 7 March that it will participate in the elections under the list name "Communist Party of Austria – European Left".

Opinion polls

Results

References

Europe
Austria
European Parliament elections in Austria